The 2016–17 NHL season was the 100th season of operation (99th season of play) of the National Hockey League. Thirty teams were competing in an 82-game regular season from October 12, 2016, to April 9, 2017. The 2017 Stanley Cup playoffs began on April 12 and concluded on June 11, with the Pittsburgh Penguins winning the Stanley Cup over the Nashville Predators in six games. On June 11, the Pittsburgh Penguins became the first team to repeat as Stanley Cup champions since the Detroit Red Wings in 1997–98, winning the franchise's fifth Stanley Cup and their third in nine seasons.

League business

Salary cap
In December 2015, commissioner Gary Bettman informed teams that he projected the salary cap to be at least $74.5 million for the 2016–17 season, and that it could increase as much as $3.1 million. It was eventually set at $73.1 million.

Rule changes
No major rule changes were implemented this season.

Expansion
On June 22, 2016, NHL Commissioner Gary Bettman officially announced that the league had approved an expansion team in Las Vegas, Nevada, later christened the Vegas Golden Knights, who were set to begin play in the 2017–18 season.

Media rights
Canadian rightsholder Rogers Media reinstated Ron MacLean as host of Hockey Night in Canada for the 2016–17 season to replace George Stroumboulopoulos, whose introduction in the 2014–15 season was met with mixed reception by viewers. MacLean will host the early game of the weekly doubleheader, with David Amber handling the late games. Alongside HNIC, MacLean continues to host the travelling, Sunday-night Hometown Hockey games on Sportsnet.

On June 20, 2016, the Buffalo Sabres announced that it had agreed to a 10-year extension of its regional television rights deal with MSG, which saw the establishment of a joint venture known as MSG Western New York—an expansion of MSG's existing regional feed for the Sabres' market which contains additional team-produced programming for the Sabres and their sister NFL team, the Buffalo Bills. There were no on-air changes in staffing for Sabres telecasts.

On June 27, 2016, Sports Business Daily reported that the NHL had reached a deal in principle with Fox Sports to allow in-market, authenticated online streaming for eligible pay TV subscribers, of regional NHL games on Fox Sports Networks via the Fox Sports Go service.

Centennial celebration 
On September 27, 2016, the NHL announced that it would organize a series of initiatives and events throughout 2017 to mark the league's 100th year of operations, and the upcoming 2017–18 season — the NHL's 100th season of play. The campaign began with the NHL Centennial Classic outdoor game on January 1, 2017, and continued throughout the calendar year, including documentaries and a daily "Time Capsule" feature across NHL media properties, a "Centennial Truck Tour" of all NHL cities with a traveling museum and other activities, a 2017 Winter Classic-themed float appearing during the Tournament of Roses Parade, and the unveiling of the top 100 players during the weekend of the All-Star Game, and the top 100 moments of the league's history later in the year.

A centennial emblem was designed, which was displayed on all game pucks and as shoulder patches on all jerseys throughout 2017. The centennial campaign extended into the following 2017–18 season. On March 17, 2017, the NHL announced that the Ottawa Senators would host an outdoor game against the Montreal Canadiens, the NHL 100 Classic, at TD Place Stadium on December 16, 2017.

Coaching changes

(*) Indicates interim.

Arena changes
 This is the Edmonton Oilers' first season at Rogers Place replacing their old arena, Rexall Place. The team played its first regular season home game on October 12, 2016, against the Calgary Flames.
 This was the Detroit Red Wings' final season at Joe Louis Arena before moving into their new arena, Little Caesars Arena, in October 2017 in time for the 2017–18 NHL season.
 The Pittsburgh Penguins' home arena was renamed from "Consol Energy Center" to PPG Paints Arena on October 4, 2016, although previous rights owner Consol Energy will remain a corporate sponsor with the Penguins.
 The Buffalo Sabres' home arena was renamed to KeyBank Center, following KeyCorp's acquisition of previous rights holder First Niagara Bank. This is the fourth name change for the arena since it opened in 1996, all related to bank mergers.

Regular season
The regular season began on October 12, 2016, and ended on April 9, 2017. The playoffs began on April 12, 2017, and ended on June 11, 2017. The schedule was released on June 21, 2016. Each team will receive a five-day "bye week" and no practices can be held during the time period.

Outdoor games
Four outdoor games were played during the 2016–17 season.

The Winnipeg Jets hosted the Heritage Classic against the Edmonton Oilers at Investors Group Field on October 23, 2016. The Oilers won the game, 3–0.

The Toronto Maple Leafs hosted the Centennial Classic at BMO Field on January 1, 2017, against the Detroit Red Wings. The game commemorated the 100th season of the Maple Leafs and NHL as a whole. The following day, January 2, 2017, the St. Louis Blues hosted the Winter Classic at Busch Stadium against the Chicago Blackhawks.

On February 25, 2017, the Pittsburgh Penguins defeated the Philadelphia Flyers 4–2 at Heinz Field during the 2017 NHL Stadium Series.

All–Star Game

The 62nd National Hockey League All-Star Game was held in Los Angeles at Staples Center, home of the Los Angeles Kings, on January 29, 2017. The format was identical to the 2016 All-Star Game.

Postponed games
The Detroit Red Wings – Carolina Hurricanes game scheduled for December 19, 2016, at PNC Arena in Raleigh, North Carolina, was postponed due to poor ice conditions. The game was rescheduled for March 27, 2017. This resulted in the two teams playing in Raleigh on consecutive nights, as they were already scheduled to play each other on March 28, and caused Detroit to play games on three consecutive nights.

The Winnipeg Jets – New Jersey Devils game scheduled for March 14, 2017, at the Prudential Center in Newark, New Jersey, was postponed due to the effects of the March 2017 nor'easter. The game was rescheduled for March 28. This resulted in both teams forfeiting a three-day break from March 27 to 29.

Standings

Tie Breakers:
1. Fewer number of games played.
2. Greater Regulation + OT Wins (ROW)
3. Greatest number of points earned in head-to-head play (If teams played an unequal # of head-to-head games, the result of the first game on the home ice of the team with the extra home game is discarded.)
4. Greater Goal differential

Playoffs

Bracket

Statistics

Scoring leaders
The following players led the league in regular season points at the conclusion of games played on April 9, 2017.

Leading goaltenders
The following goaltenders led the league in regular season goals against average at the conclusion of games played on April 9, 2017, while playing at least 1800 minutes.

NHL awards

Awards were presented at the NHL Awards ceremony, to be held following the 2017 Stanley Cup playoffs. Finalists for voted awards are announced during the playoffs and winners are presented at the award ceremony. Voting will conclude immediately after the end of the regular season. The Presidents' Trophy, the Prince of Wales Trophy and Clarence S. Campbell Bowl are not presented at the awards ceremony. The Lester Patrick Trophy is announced during the summer and presented in the fall.

All-Star teams

Milestones

First games

The following is a list of notable players who played their first NHL game during the 2016–17 season, listed with their first team.

Last games

The following is a list of players of note who played their last NHL game in 2016–17, listed with their team:

Major milestones reached
 On October 12, 2016, Toronto Maple Leafs forward Auston Matthews became the first player in the modern era to score four goals in his NHL debut.
 On October 18, 2016, Chicago Blackhawks forward Marian Hossa became the 44th player in league history to score 500 goals.
 On October 20, 2016, Florida Panthers forward Jaromir Jagr became the third player in league history to score 750 goals.
 On November 1, 2016, St. Louis Blues defenceman Jay Bouwmeester played his 1,000th NHL game. becoming the 307th player in league history to reach the mark.
 On November 12, 2016, Montreal Canadiens goaltender Carey Price became the first goaltender in league history to win his first 10 games of the season.
 On November 20, 2016, Los Angeles Kings forward Jeff Carter scored his 600th point.
 On December 10, 2016, Ottawa Senators forward Chris Neil played his 1,000th NHL game. becoming the 308th player in league history to reach the mark.
 On December 10, 2016, Colorado Avalanche forward Jarome Iginla participated in his 1,500th NHL game becoming the 16th player to do so.
 On December 18, 2016, Columbus Blue Jackets head coach John Tortorella won his 500th game, becoming the first American-born coach, as well as 24th overall, with 500 victories.
 On December 22, 2016, Florida Panthers forward Jaromir Jagr scored his 1,888th career point, surpassing Mark Messier to become second in career points.
 On December 22, 2017, Los Angeles Kings forward Anze Kopitar scored his 700th point.
 On December 23, 2016, Arizona Coyotes forward Shane Doan scored his 400th goal and played his 1,500th game with the Coyotes.
 On December 31, 2016, New York Rangers goaltender Henrik Lundqvist recorded his 390th career win, surpassing Dominik Hasek to become the all-time wins leader among European-born goaltenders.
 On January 2, 2017, St. Louis Blues forward Alexander Steen scored his 500th point.
 On January 7, 2017, San Jose Sharks forward Joe Pavelski scored his 600th point.
 On January 11, 2017, Washington Capitals forward Alexander Ovechkin became the 84th player in league history to score 1,000 points.
 On January 13, 2017, New York Islanders forward John Tavares scored his 500th point.
 On January 20, 2017, Vancouver Canucks forward Henrik Sedin became the 85th player in league history to score 1,000 points.
 On January 22, 2017, Nashville Predators head coach Peter Laviolette won his 500th game, becoming the 25th coach, and second American-born, to reach the mark.
 On February 2, 2017, San Jose Sharks forward Patrick Marleau became the 45th player in league history to score 500 goals.
 On February 3, 2017, New York Islanders forward Jason Chimera played his 1,000th game, becoming the 309th player in league history to reach the mark.
 On February 11, 2017, New York Rangers goaltender Henrik Lundqvist became the 12th goaltender in league history to win 400 games.
 On February 15, 2017, Florida Panthers forward Jaromir Jagr scored his 1,900th point.
 On February 16, 2017, Pittsburgh Penguins forward Sidney Crosby became the 86th player in league history to score 1,000 points.
 On February 19, 2017, Chicago Blackhawks forward Patrick Kane became the first American-born player in league history to score 20 or more goals in his first 10 seasons.
 On February 26, 2017, Arizona Coyotes forward Radim Vrbata scored his 600th point.
 On February 28, 2017, Washington Capitals head coach Barry Trotz won his 700th game, becoming the sixth coach to reach the mark.
 On March 6, 2017, San Jose Sharks forward Joe Thornton became the 13th player in league history to reach 1,000 assists.
 On March 9, 2017, Arizona Coyotes forward Radim Vrbata played his 1,000th NHL game, becoming the 310th player in league history to reach the mark.
 On March 13, 2017, the Calgary Flames won their tenth consecutive game, joining the Columbus Blue Jackets (16 games), Minnesota Wild (12) and Philadelphia Flyers (10), marking the 2016–17 season as the first with a win streak of 10 or more games from four teams.
 On March 19, 2017, Minnesota Wild forward Eric Staal played his 1,000th NHL game, becoming the 311th player in league history to reach the mark.
 On March 19, 2017, Florida Panthers forward Jaromir Jagr played his 1,700th NHL game, becoming the fourth player in league history to reach the mark.
 On March 27, 2017, Buffalo Sabres forward Brian Gionta played his 1,000th NHL game, becoming the 312th player in league history to reach the mark.
 On March 28, 2017, Washington Capitals goaltender Braden Holtby became the third goaltender in league history to record at least 40 wins in three consecutive seasons, joining Martin Brodeur (2005–2008) and Evgeni Nabokov (2007–2010).
 On March 28, 2017, Washington Capitals forward Alexander Ovechkin scored his 558th career goal, passing Johnny Bucyk for 26th on the NHL's all-time scoring list.
 On April 9, 2017, Detroit Red Wings forward Henrik Zetterberg played his 1,000th NHL game, becoming the 313th player to reach the mark.

Uniforms
 The Calgary Flames changed alternate jerseys, retiring the script-laden, Western-style alternate used since 2013 in favor of their throwback red uniforms, which had previously been given alternate distinction from 2010 to 2013.
 The Florida Panthers unveiled a brand new logo and uniform set on June 2, 2016, for the 2016–17 season.
 The Los Angeles Kings unveiled a special third jersey for their 50th anniversary.
 The Nashville Predators switched to gold helmets full-time when playing at home.
 The New York Rangers added a shoulder patch to commemorate their 90th anniversary.
 The Philadelphia Flyers released a special third jersey for their 50th anniversary. The team had previously unveiled a teaser photo of this jersey, showing the 50th anniversary patch on the right shoulder of the uniform. The numbers on the back and sleeves of this jersey are gold, and the main crest is also outlined in gold. The team has also announced a black Stadium Series jersey with orange detailing for its Stadium Series game against the Penguins.
 The Pittsburgh Penguins return to using black and "Pittsburgh gold" as their primary colors and will debut a new away uniform retiring "Vegas gold" that has been used in at least some capacity since 2000. As with the Flyers, the Penguins are debuting a new Stadium Series jersey for the February 25 outdoor game, this one being predominantly yellow with black sleeves and a keystone-shaped "City of Champions" patch.
 The Toronto Maple Leafs unveiled a new logo on February 2, 2016, for the team's centennial season. Their new uniforms were unveiled during the 2016 NHL Entry Draft. For the 2017 Centennial Classic, the Leafs wore specially designed jerseys which recalled their history as the Toronto Arenas and Toronto St. Patricks.
 The Detroit Red Wings joined the Maple Leafs in unveiling Centennial Classic jerseys for the game played on January 1, 2017.
 Beginning January 1, 2017, all jerseys contain patches of the NHL's centennial emblem, located above or below the numbers on their right sleeves.
 From February 15, 2017, until the end of the regular season, the Detroit Red Wings wore a commemorative "Mr. I" patch on the shoulder of their jerseys in memory of team owner, Mike Ilitch, who died on February 10, 2017.

See also
2016–17 NHL transactions
2016–17 NHL suspensions and fines
2016–17 NHL Three Star Awards
2016 in sports
2017 in sports
List of National Hockey League attendance figures (2016-17 season)

References

External links
2016–17 NHL season schedule

 
1
1